Boris Worm is a marine ecologist, and the Killam Research Professor at Dalhousie University in Halifax, Nova Scotia, Canada.

Worm is known for his scientific contributions and commitment to spreading public awareness regarding marine conservation. In 2004 he received the German "Heinz Maier Leibnitz"-Award, an award for young researchers from the German Research Foundation (DFG).

Selected publications
 Myers RA, Worm B (2003) Rapid worldwide depletion of predatory fish communities. Nature 423:280-283 
 Worm, et al. (2006) Impacts of Biodiversity Loss on Ocean Ecosystem Services. Science, 314: 787-790 
 Worm, et al. (2009) Rebuilding Global Fisheries. Science, 325 (5940): 578–585. 
 Tittensor DP, Mora C, Jetz W, Lotze HK, Ricard D, Vanden Berghe, E, Worm B (2010) Global patterns and predictors of marine biodiversity across taxa. Nature 466: 1098-1101 
 Mora C, Tittensor DP, Adl S, Simpson AGB, Worm B (2011) How many species are there on Earth and in the ocean? PLoS Biology 9: e1001127 
 Pinsky ML, Worm B, Fogarty MJ, Sarmiento JL, Levin SA (2013) Marine taxa track local climate velocities. Science 341:1239-1242 
 Worm B, Paine RT (2016) Humans as a hyperkeystone species. Trends in Ecology and Evolution 31:600-607
 Worm B, Lotze HK, Jubinville I, Wilcox C, Jambeck J. (2017) Plastic as a persistent marine pollutant. Annual Review of Environment and Resources 42:1-26

References

Academic staff of the Dalhousie University
Fisheries scientists
Living people
1969 births
21st-century Canadian zoologists
Fellows of the Royal Society of Canada